Yukishiro is a  Japanese family name. Fictional people with the name include:

Yukishiro Enishi, a character in the Japanese manga series Rurouni Kenshin and the main antagonist of the final arc of the series.
Yukishiro Tomoe, a character in the manga Rurouni Kenshin and older sister of Yukishiro Enishi in the story.
Honoka Yukishiro, one the main female protagonists in the first series of Pretty Cure, Futari wa Pretty Cure.
Nanako Yukishiro, the main character from the manga Senryu Girl.
Reika Yukishiro, a female character in the third installment of the Japanese survival horror video game Fatal Frame series, Fatal Frame III: The Tormented and the main antagonist of the game.

Japanese-language surnames